Asle Jorgenson Gronna (December 10, 1858May 4, 1922) was an American politician who served in the House of Representatives and Senate from North Dakota, and one of the six to vote against the United States declaration of war leading to the First World War.

Biography
Gronna was born in Elkader, Clayton County, Iowa, of Norwegian ancestry, and was raised in Houston County, Minnesota. He attended the public schools of Houston County and Caledonia Academy. After graduating, he obtained his qualification as a school teacher and taught in Wilmington, Minnesota.

In 1879, Gronna moved to the Dakota Territory, where he farmed, taught school, and was active in several business ventures. He served as president of Lakota, North Dakota's village and president of Lakota's board of education. A Republican, he was elected to the Dakota Territorial House of Representatives in 1889.

Gronna was a successful Republican candidate for the United States House of Representatives in 1904. He was reelected in 1906 and 1908, and served in the 59th , 60th, and 61st Congresses.  In 1911 he was elected to the United States Senate, filling the vacancy caused by the death of Martin N. Johnson. Gronna was re-elected in 1914 and served in the 62nd through 65th Congresses. He was an unsuccessful candidate for reelection in 1920 and left office on March 3, 1921.

In Congress, Gronna earned the reputation of a Republican who reflected the attitudes of his region - progressive and isolationist. He blamed munition makers for the preparedness movement and World War I and was part of the "little group of willful men," who opposed President Woodrow Wilson. In 1919 he was a staunch isolationist who opposed the League of Nations treaty because it further entangled the United States in foreign relationships and limited national decision making.

Personal life
He and his wife Bertha were the parents of James D. Gronna who served as Secretary of State of North Dakota. Asle Gronna died on May 4, 1922, and was buried in the Lakota Cemetery.

References

Further reading
Phillips, William W. The Life of Asle J. Gronna  (Ph.D. dissertation, University of Missouri, 1958)
Schlup, Leonard. "North Dakota Senator Asle J. Gronna and the Isolationists, 1915-1920" North Dakota History (1992) 60#1 pp 13–21.

External links

1858 births
1922 deaths
American people of Norwegian descent
Republican Party United States senators from North Dakota
People from Elkader, Iowa
People from Houston County, Minnesota
People from Nelson County, North Dakota
Members of the Dakota Territorial Legislature
19th-century American politicians
Republican Party members of the United States House of Representatives from North Dakota